The Anglo-Albanian Association is an association established in 1913 by Aubrey Herbert under the name Albanian Committee. In 1918 this committee evolved into Anglo-Albanian Society and then into the Anglo-Albanian Association.

Objectives 
The Anglo-Albanian Association was founded to support the Albanian cause in Great Britain and to promote recognition of the Independent Albania.

Members 
Some of the members were Edith Durham, Lord Lamington and Dervish Duma.

After 1985 the Chairman of the Anglo-Albanian Association was Harry Hodgkinson, British writer, journalist, and naval intelligence officer. Its current president is Noel Malcolm.

References

External links 
 Website of the Anglo-Albanian Association

United Kingdom friendship associations
Albania friendship associations
1913 establishments in the United Kingdom
Organizations established in 1913
Albania–United Kingdom relations